John Somerville was a Scottish footballer and manager, serving in both capacities, as well as that of secretary, for Bolton Wanderers.

Joining the club in 1890 from Ayr, he went on to make 293 appearances for the club, playing on the losing side in the 1894 FA Cup Final. When Frank Brettell left the club in 1898, Somerville was made secretary-player, on retirement becoming secretary-manager (leading the team to the 1904 FA Cup Final, again resulting in defeat) and eventually becoming the club's first full-time manager in 1908. Under Somerville, the club were promoted to the First Division on three separate occasions and relegated four times. During the season that Bolton were relegated the fourth time (1909–10), Somerville stepped down, being replaced by Will Settle. He remained as secretary for the rest of the season before leaving the club. He later became a Football League linesman.

Notes

1869 births
1917 deaths
Scottish footballers
Scottish football managers
Footballers from Ayr
Association football fullbacks
Bolton Wanderers F.C. managers
Bolton Wanderers F.C. players
Date of birth missing
Date of death missing
English Football League managers
English Football League players
FA Cup Final players